Peyrolles is the name or part of the name of the following communes in France:
 Peyrolles, Aude, in the Aude department
 Peyrolles, Gard (formerly Peyroles), in the Gard department
 Peyrolles-en-Provence, in the Bouches-du-Rhône department

See also 
 Peyrole, in the Tarn department

oc:Pèiramala